Kodjo Balogou (born 17 November 1976) is a Togolese footballer. He played in six matches for the Togo national football team in 1997. He was also named in Togo's squad for the 1998 African Cup of Nations tournament.

References

External links
 

1976 births
Living people
Togolese footballers
Togo international footballers
1998 African Cup of Nations players
Association football defenders
21st-century Togolese people
AS Monaco FC players
SAS Épinal players
Neuchâtel Xamax FCS players
Stade de Reims players
Togolese expatriate footballers
Expatriate footballers in France
Expatriate footballers in Switzerland
People from Atakpamé